The women's 3000 metres event  at the 1999 IAAF World Indoor Championships was held on March 7.

Results

References
Results

3000
3000 metres at the World Athletics Indoor Championships
1999 in women's athletics